Sivanesan a/l Achalingam is a Malaysian politician who has served as Member of the Perak State Executive Council (EXCO) in the Pakatan Rakyat (PR), Pakatan Harapan (PH) and Barisan Nasional (BN) state administrations under Menteris Besar Mohammad Nizar Jamaluddin, Ahmad Faizal Azumu and Saarani Mohamad from March 2008 to the collapse of the PR state administration in February 2009, from May 2018 to the collapse of the PH state administration in March 2020 and again since November 2022. He has also served as Member of the Perak State Legislative Assembly (MLA) for Sungkai since March 2008. He is a member of the Democratic Action Party (DAP), a component party of the PH coalition.

Election results

Notes

References 

Living people
People from Perak
Malaysian people of Indian descent
Democratic Action Party (Malaysia) politicians
21st-century Malaysian politicians
Members of the Perak State Legislative Assembly
Perak state executive councillors
1956 births